{{Infobox person
| name               = Joseph Safra
| image              = 
| caption            = 
| birth_date         = 
| birth_place        = Beirut, Lebanon<ref>'Joseph Safra (1956) and Joseph Safra (1956), information from the National Archives, Rio de Janeiro. Scan of Joseph Safra's Brazilian entry visa on 1956 on familysearch.org</ref>
| death_date         = 
| death_place        = São Paulo, Brazil
| nationality        = Lebanese Brazilian
| organization       = Safra Group
| education          = 
| spouse             = Vicky Sarfati
| children           = 4; including Alberto J. Safra
| parents            = Jacob Safra  Esther Safra
| relatives          = Moise Safra (brother) Edmond Safra (brother)
| known_for          = The richest banker in the world
}}

Joseph Safra (‎; 1 September 1938 – 10 December 2020) was a Swiss-based Lebanese Brazilian banker and billionaire businessman, who ran the Brazilian banking and investment empire, Safra Group.

Joseph Safra was the chairman of all Safra companies, among them Safra National Bank of New York and Banco Safra headquartered in São Paulo, Brazil. In August 2020, Forbes'' reported Safra's estimated net worth at US$22.8 billion, the 52nd richest person in the world and richest in Brazil.

Early life
Joseph Safra was born and raised in Beirut, Lebanon to a family of Sephardic Jewish background originally from Lebanon and Syria with banking connections back to Ottoman times. The family's history in banking originated with caravan trade between Aleppo, Beirut, Alexandria, and Istanbul during the Ottoman Empire. The Safra family moved to Brazil in 1952.

Career 
In 1955, Joseph's 23-year-old brother, Edmond Safra, and his father, Jacob Safra, started working in Brazil by financing assets in São Paulo. However soon, Edmond Safra separated from his brothers Joseph and Moise and headed to New York City where he founded the Republic National Bank of New York (which he later sold to HSBC in 1999 and donated most of his money to the Edmond Safra Foundation). Joseph Safra founded Banco Safra in 1955 and today it is reportedly the 6th largest private bank in Brazil. In 2006, Joseph Safra acquired the remaining shares of Banco Safra from his brother Moise Safra. He remained the chairman of the Safra Group, offering banking services throughout Europe, North America, and South America, until the end of his life.

Property 
In 2013, Joseph Safra's family acquired more than a dozen properties in the United States, primarily in New York City. They also own a portfolio of commercial real estate in Brazil.

In 2014, Safra paid more than £700 million to buy The Gherkin, one of the most distinctive towers in the City of London. He proposed to build the Tulip, a skyscraper in London, but the city's mayor rejected it in 2019. He founded the Jewish Brazilian school of Beit Yaacov in 2001.

Business holdings
Chiquita
Safra Group
Banco Safra
J. Safra Sarasin
Safra National Bank of New York

Personal life
Safra used to live in Geneva, Switzerland.

In 1969, he married Vicky Sarfati. Jacob is responsible for the international operations while David manages Banco Safra in Brazil.

Joseph Safra died on 10 December 2020 in São Paulo at the age of 82. He had Parkinson's disease.

See also
List of Brazilians by net worth

References

External links
Meet Joseph Safra, The Richest Banker On The Planet and The Safra Dynasty: The Mysterious Family Of The Richest Banker In The World on Business Insider

1938 births
2020 deaths
Brazilian Sephardi Jews
Brazilian people of Lebanese-Jewish descent
Brazilian people of Syrian-Jewish descent
20th-century Sephardi Jews
21st-century Sephardi Jews
Mizrahi Jews
Lebanese people of Syrian-Jewish descent
Lebanese emigrants to Brazil
Brazilian bankers
Brazilian billionaires
Safra family